Jabal Thawr is a mountain in Saudi Arabia, located in the lower part of Mecca to the south of the district of Misfalah.

Cave
The mountain is notable for housing a cave known as Ghār Thawr, in which the Islamic prophet Muhammad took refuge from the Quraysh, during the migration to Medina. For most Muslims, the cave is of religious significance, and is thus visited by many pilgrims and tourists. In Sunni Islam, it is believed that Muhammad stayed here as a refugee with his companion Abu Bakr.

References

Thawr